Daleko je Sunce (trans. Distant is the Sun) is the sixth studio album from Serbian and former Yugoslav rock band Galija. It is the first part of the trilogy consisting of this album, the album Korak do slobode and the album Istorija, ti i ja.

Concept
At the time of the Daleko je Sunce recording Galija started cooperating with flutist Bata Zlatković and lyricist Radoman Kanjevac. Kanjevac brought up an idea of releasing a trilogy which would deal with problems of Socialist Federal Republic of Yugoslavia in transition. The result were albums Daleko je Sunce, Korak do slobode and Istorija, ti i ja with which Galija reached the peak of popularity. The first album of the trilogy itself was entitled after a novel by Dobrica Ćosić, while the songs were entitled after the works of writers Branko Ćopić, Ivo Andrić, Laza Lazarević, and Aleksa Šantić.

The song "Zebre i bizoni" was dealing with the enigma of Josip Broz Tito's residence at Brijuni, and the song lyrics were not printed on the album inner sleeve.

Album cover
The album cover was designed by Slobodan Kaštavarac and features a photograph of sunset at Mount Athos, Greece, taken by Danko Đurić. The back cover features a photograph of the sky above Hilandar Monastery, also taken by Đurić.

Track listing
"Da li si spavala" – 3:09
"Žena koje nema" – 4:11
"Bez naslova" – 3:33
"Zebre i bizoni" – 2:59
"Orlovi rano lete" - 5:14
"Intimni odnosi" – 2:59
"Švabica" – 2:25
"Će me voliš" – 2:30
"Nebo nad Makarskom" – 3:48
"Mi znamo sudbu" – 3:26
"Kao i obično" – 4:02

Personnel
Nenad Milosavljević - vocals
Predrag Milosavljević - vocals
Jean Jacques Roscam - guitar
Bata Zlatković - flute
Zoran Radosavljević - bass guitar
Boban Pavlović - drums

Guest musicians
Kornelije Kovač - keyboards
Saša Lokner - keyboards
Ivan Vdović - drums
Nenad Stefanović "Japanac" - bass guitar
Fejat Sejdić Trumpet Orchestra

References 
 EX YU ROCK enciklopedija 1960-2006,  Janjatović Petar;  

Galija albums
1988 albums
PGP-RTB albums
Concept albums
Cultural depictions of Josip Broz Tito